White Lung was a Canadian punk rock band. The band consisted of Mish Barber-Way (vocals), Kenneth William (guitars) and Anne-Marie Vassiliou (drums). They have released two albums on Deranged Records and their latest two on Domino Recording Company. Exclaim! named the band's first full-length album It's the Evil as 2010's punk album of the year.  The band was nominated for Punk/Hardcore Artist/Group of the Year at the 2011 Canadian Music Week Indie Awards.

History

White Lung was formed in Vancouver, British Columbia, Canada in 2006. They first attained recognition as one of the standout acts involved with the Vancouver Emergency Room scene. Exclaim! named the band's first full-length album It's the Evil as 2010's punk album of the year. Anne-Marie Vassiliou is an ex-member of the band The Riff Randells.

The band was nominated for Punk/Hardcore Artist/Group of the Year at the 2011 Canadian Music Week Indie Awards. Their second album, Sorry, was released 29 May 2012 to critical acclaim from Spin, Pitchfork, Magnet, Exclaim! and Rolling Stone.

White Lung released their third studio album, Deep Fantasy, on 16 June 2014 through Domino Recording Company. It resulted in increased exposure and the band began to play larger venues. In 2015, the band announced that Lindsey Troy of Deap Vally had joined as a touring bass-player.

The band's fourth album, Paradise, was released on 6 May 2016. In contrast to previous records, the album had "more story-centric songs while Barber-Way find that live the older songs "have taken on a new meaning when I'm onstage. I conjure up a new kind of anger".

The band announced in September 2022 they will be breaking up following the release of their fifth and final album, Premonition, in December 2022.

Band members

Former members
Mish Barber-Way – vocals (2006–2022)
Anne-Marie Vassiliou  – drums (2006–2022)
Kenneth William – guitars (2009–2022)
Natasha Reich – guitars (2006–2008)
Grady Mackintosh – bass (2006–2013)

Former touring members
Caroline Doyle – bass (2016–2021)
Hether Fortune – bass (2013–2015)
Lindsey Troy – bass (2015–2017)

Timeline

Discography

Studio albums
It's the Evil (2010)
Sorry (2012)
Deep Fantasy (2014)
Paradise (2016)
Premonition (2022)

Singles

Various artists compilations

Music videos

References

External links

Bio @ Deranged Records
White Lung on Bandcamp

2006 establishments in British Columbia
Canadian indie rock groups
Canadian musical trios
Canadian punk rock groups
Musical groups established in 2006
Musical groups from Vancouver
Riot grrrl bands